Svetlana Vladimirovna Babich (née , Korolyova; born July 17, 1947) is a retired female javelin thrower who represented the Soviet Union twice at the Summer Olympics: 1972 and 1976. She is best known for winning the gold medal in the women's javelin throw event at the 1973 Summer Universiade.

References

1947 births
Living people
People from Altai Krai
Russian female javelin throwers
Soviet female javelin throwers
Athletes (track and field) at the 1972 Summer Olympics
Athletes (track and field) at the 1976 Summer Olympics
Olympic athletes of the Soviet Union
Universiade medalists in athletics (track and field)
Universiade gold medalists for the Soviet Union
Medalists at the 1973 Summer Universiade
Sportspeople from Altai Krai
20th-century Russian women